Música Serve pra Isso (Portuguese for "Music Was Made for This") is the second and currently last studio album by Brazilian experimental rock duo Os Mulheres Negras, released in 1990 by WEA. Unlike its predecessor Música e Ciência it follows a slightly less experimental direction influenced by traditional Brazilian and African music (as visible in the tracks "Guembô", "Martim" and "Só Quero um Xodó", a cover of singer Dominguinhos). It was re-issued in CD format in 2001 alongside Música e Ciência.

The duo broke up one year after the album's release, and endured a 21-year hiatus before reuniting in 2012.

One of the duo's components, Maurício Pereira, covered "Música Serve pra Isso" and "Imbarueri" for his second solo album, Mergulhar na Surpresa, released in 1998.

Track listing

Personnel
 André Abujamra – vocals, electric guitar, synthesizer, drum machine, production
 Maurício Pereira – vocals, saxophone, production
 Artur Maia – bass (tracks 4 and 10)
 Kuki Stolarski – drums (track 9)
 Théo Werneck – backing vocals (track 9)

References

1990 albums
Os Mulheres Negras albums
Warner Music Group albums